His Story may refer to:

 His Story (album), a 2005 album by MC Mong
 "His Story" (Scrubs), a 2003 episode of the television 
series Scrubs
 His Story (web series), a Hindi drama
 "His Story", a song by TLC from Ooooooohhh... On the TLC Tip
 "His-Story", a song by Beenie Man from Maestro

See also 
 HIStory: Past, Present and Future, Book I, an album by Michael Jackson
 "HIStory" (song), the title song